This is a list of compositions by composer Ernest Bloch.

Stage 

Macbeth, Opera in 3 acts (1909 Geneva-Paris)

Orchestral

Symphony in C minor (1902)
Hiver-Printemps (1905 Paris-Geneva)
Trois Poèmes Juifs for large orchestra (1913 Satigny)
Israel, Symphony for orchestra (1916 Geneva)
In the Night: A Love Poem (1922 Cleveland)
Poems of the Sea (1922 Cleveland)
Concerto Grosso No. 1 for string orchestra with piano obbligato (1925 Santa Fe - Cleveland)
Four Episodes for chamber orchestra (1926 San Francisco)
America, an Epic Rhapsody (1926 San Francisco)
Helvetia, Symphonic Poem (1929 Frankfurt - San Francisco)
Evocations, Symphonic Suite (1937 Châtel, Haute Savoie)
Suite Symphonique (1944 Agate Beach)
In Memoriam (1952 Agate Beach)
Concerto Grosso No. 2 for string orchestra (1952 Agate Beach)
Sinfonia Breve (1953 Agate Beach)
Symphony in E (1955 Agate Beach)

Concertante

Schelomo: Rhapsodie Hébraïque for cello solo and large orchestra (1916 Geneva-New York)
Suite for viola and orchestra (1919 New York)
Voice in the Wilderness, Symphonic Poem for orchestra with cello obbligato (1936 Châtel, Haute Savoie)
Concerto for violin and orchestra (1938 Châtel, Haute Savoie)
Baal Shem for violin and orchestra (1939)
Concerto Symphonique for piano and orchestra (1948 Agate Beach)
Scherzo Fantasque for piano and orchestra (1948 Agate Beach)
Concertino for flute, viola and string orchestra (1948, 1950 Agate Beach)
Suite Hébraïque, for viola (or violin) and orchestra (1951 Agate Beach)
Symphony for trombone and orchestra (1954 Agate Beach)
Proclamation for trumpet and orchestra (1955 Agate Beach)
Suite Modale for flute and string orchestra (1956 Agate Beach)
Two Last Poems for flute solo and orchestra (1958 Agate Beach)

Vocal and choral

Historiettes au Crépuscule for mezzo-soprano and piano (1904 Paris)
Poèmes d'Automne for mezzo-soprano and orchestra (1906 Geneva)
Psaume 22 (1913 Satigny)
Deux Psaumes pour soprano et orchestre, précédés d'un prélude orchestral (1914 Satigny)
America: An Epic Rhapsody for chorus and orchestra (1926 San Francisco)

Avodath Hakodesh (Sacred Service) for baritone, orchestra, and chorus (1933 Roveredo-Ticino)

Chamber

Piano quintet 

Piano Quintet No. 1 (1923 Cleveland)
Piano Quintet No. 2 (1957)

String quartet 

String Quartet in G (1896)
String Quartet No. 1 (1916 Geneva - New York)
String Quartet No. 2 (1945 Agate Beach)
String Quartet No. 3 (1952 Agate Beach)
String Quartet No. 4 (1953 Agate Beach)
String Quartet No. 5 (1956 Agate Beach)
In the Mountains (1924 Cleveland)
Night (1923 Cleveland)
Paysages (1923 Cleveland); the first movement North was inspired by Robert J. Flaherty's Nanook of the North
Prelude (1925 Cleveland)
Two Pieces (1938, 1950 Châtel, Haute Savoie - Agate Beach)

Piano trio 

Three Nocturnes for piano trio (1924 Cleveland)

Instrumental

Violin 

Sonata No. 1 for violin and piano (1920 Cleveland)
Baal Shem (1923 Cleveland)
Poème Mystique, Sonata No. 2 for violin and piano (1924 Cleveland)
Nuit Exotique (1924 Cleveland)
Abodah (1929 San Francisco)
Mélodie (1929 San Francisco)
Suite Hébraïque for violin and piano (1951 Agate Beach)
Suite No. 1 for violin solo (1958 Agate Beach)
Suite No. 2 for violin solo (1958 Agate Beach)

Viola 

Suite for viola and piano (1919 New York)
Suite Hébraïque for viola and piano (1951 Agate Beach)
Meditation and Processional for viola and piano (1951 Agate Beach)
Suite for viola solo (unfinished) (1958 Agate Beach)

Cello 
Cello Sonata (1897)
Méditation Hébraïque (1924 Cleveland)
From Jewish Life (1925 Cleveland)
Suite No. 1 for cello solo (1956 Agate Beach)
Suite No. 2 for cello solo (1956 Agate Beach)
Suite No. 3 for cello solo (1957 Agate Beach)

Flute 

Suite Modale for flute and piano (1956 Agate Beach)

Piano

Ex-voto (1914 Geneva)
In the Night: A Love Poem (1922 Cleveland)
Poems of the Sea (1922 Cleveland)
Four Circus Pieces (1922 Cleveland)
Danse Sacrée (1923 Cleveland)
Enfantines, 10 pieces for children (1923 Cleveland)
Nirvana, Poem (1923 Cleveland)
Five Sketches in Sepia (1923 Cleveland)
Sonata (1935 Châtel, Haute Savoie); written for Guido Agosti
Visions et Prophéties (1936 Châtel, Haute Savoie)

Organ

6 Preludes (1949 Agate Beach)
4 Wedding Marches (1950 Agate Beach)

References

Lists of compositions by composer